Hypostomus yaku is a species of South American armoured catfish from the family Loricariidae. It is only known from the Rio Quente, a small thermal stream in the Rio Paranaíba drainage of the upper Paraná basin, Brazil. H. yaku is unusual when compared to other species of Hypostomus in that it tolerates warm water up to 34 °C and only attains a relatively small size, growing to 70.8 mm SL.

Taxonomy
H. yaku can be distinguished from the other members of Hypostomus, some 140 plus species, by the presence, in mature adults, of hypertrophied odontodes arranged randomly along its flanks and caudal peduncle. This characteristic is also found in species of other Hypostominae genera, Aphanotorulus, Peckoltia and Squaliforma, but can be distinguished by several keys (see Martins et al. 2014). H. yaku is most similar to two other species found in the same region, H. nigromaculatus and H. paulinus, but can differentiated by a lack of dark spots (versus presence in H. nigromaculatus) and by smaller adult size (70.8mm SL versus 135mm SL in H. paulinus).

References

Hypostominae

Fish described in 2014
Freshwater fish of Brazil
Endemic fauna of Brazil
Taxa named by Fernanda de Oliveira Martins
Taxa named by Francisco Langeani-Neto
Taxa named by Cláudio Henrique Zawadzki